Evander Holyfield vs. Hasim Rahman, billed as "The Royal Comeback", was a professional boxing match contested on June 1, 2002.

Background
In April 2002, it was announced that Evander Holyfield and Hasim Rahman would face each other in June of that year in Atlantic City. The bout was a WBC "eliminator", with the winner to be named the number-one contender to the WBC heavyweight title then held by Lennox Lewis. Both Holyfield and Rahman had held and then lost a version of the heavyweight title the previous year; Holyfield had lost the WBA heavyweight title to John Ruiz in May 2001 and then fought to a draw in December in an unsuccessful bid to regain the title, while Rahman had defeated Lewis in April 2001 to win the WBC and IBF heavyweight titles but lost them in a rematch to Lewis in November.

The fight was promoted by Don King, who was making his return to the state of New Jersey after having previously been banned from promoting fights there in 1994 due to an indictment for insurance fraud. King dubbed the event "The Royal Comeback" as a result.

The Holyfield–Rahman fight was held on June 1, 2002 only one week before the highly anticipated fight between Lewis and Mike Tyson, causing the former fight to be overshadowed by the latter. HBO Sports president Ross Greenberg hoped the Holyfield–Rahman fight would benefit from the hype surrounding the Lewis–Tyson bout stating "It'll be like the Golden Globes before the Oscars." King, however, would claim " We have the only fight in June!"

The fight
Holyfield controlled the majority of the fight, landing more total punches (129 to Rahman's 118) and having a decisive edge in power punches (102 to Rahman's 71). In the seventh round, Holyfield hit Rahman with a headbutt that caused a massive hematoma to develop above Rahman's left eye and Rahman's corner-man tried to stop the swelling between rounds seven and eight to no avail. Rahman would go out and fight in the eight round, but as the hematoma continue to swell and effect Rahman's vision, the referee stopped the fight midway through the round and after consulting with the ringside physician, the fight was stopped. The decision would then go to the judge's scorecards, one judge had Rahman ahead by the score 67–66, but the other two had Holyfield winning with identical, scores of 69–64, leading to Holyfield being declared the winner by split technical decision.

Aftermath
Rahman was critical of Holyfield after the fight, stating "I don't feel it was a fair or official fight. I don't feel Evander beat me tonight" and later joking at the post-fight press conference "I'm sitting here with an extra head" and that he would "wear a helmet next time."

After his knockout win over Tyson Lennox Lewis vacated the IBF title at the urging of promoter Don King, which allowed King to put together a fight between Holyfield and Chris Byrd for the vacant belt with hopes of pitting the winner against the winner of the John Ruiz–Roy Jones Jr. WBA championship bout.

Rahman would go on to face David Tua in a rematch which was controversially scored a draw.

Fight card

Broadcasting

References

2002 in boxing
Boxing on HBO
Rahman
June 2002 sports events in the United States
Boxing matches at Boardwalk Hall